Ross Goodacre is a former association football player who represented New Zealand at an international level.

Playing career
Goodacre made a solitary official international appearance for New Zealand as a substitute in a 0–5 loss to Indonesia on 21 September 1997.

References 

Living people
New Zealand association footballers
New Zealand international footballers
1978 births
Association football midfielders